Thomas Walsh (1931 – 5 September 2013) was an Irish hurler. He played with club sides Dunnamaggin and Carrickshock and was an All-Ireland Championship winner with the Kilkenny senior hurling team.

Playing career

Walsh first came to prominence in 1951 when he won a senior county medal with Carrickshock before later joining the Dunnamaggin club. After lining out with the Kilkenny minor team during the 1949 Leinster Championship, he won an All-Ireland medal with the junior team in 1951. Walsh added another junior medal to his collection when winning the All Ireland title again in 1956, with his brother Jim lining out alongside him at full-back. The pair assumed the same positions for the Kilkenny senior team in 1957. Walsh went on to win his only senior All-Ireland title that year after beating Waterford in the final. His other honours at senior level include three Leinster Championships and a National Hurling League title. Walsh's grandnephew, Brian Hogan, was Kilkenny's All-Ireland-winning captain in 2011.

Honours

Carrickshock
Kilkenny Senior Hurling Championship (1): 1951

Kilkenny
All-Ireland Senior Hurling Championship (1): 1957
Leinster Senior Hurling Championship (3): 1957, 1958, 1959
National Hurling League (1): 1961-62
All-Ireland Junior Hurling Championship (2): 1951, 1956
Leinster Junior Hurling Championship (2): 1951, 1956

References

1931 births
Living people
Carrickshock hurlers
Dunnamaggin hurlers
Kilkenny inter-county hurlers
All-Ireland Senior Hurling Championship winners